Sesbania formosa (common names - White dragon tree, Vegetable humming bird, Swamp corkwood; Dragon tree; Dragon flower tree) is a leguminous tree native to northern Australia, first described in 1860 by Ferdinand von Mueller as Agati formosum, from specimens collected the banks of the Victoria and Fitzmaurice Rivers. It was transferred to the genus, Sesbania, by Nancy Burbidge in 1965.

It is native to Western Australia and the Northern Territory, and  grows in tropical wetlands,  to heights of 20 to 30 feet, in closed forests or swampy sites, from sea level to 100 m.

Gallery

References

External links

 Sesbania formosa occurrence data from GBIF.

Faboideae
Trees of Australia
Nitrogen-fixing crops